Hong Kong competed at the 2022 World Aquatics Championships in Budapest, Hungary from 18 June to 3 July.

Open water swimming

Hong Kong entered 4 open water swimmers (2 male and 2 female )

Men

Women

Mixed

Swimming

Hong Kong entered 10 swimmers.
Men

Women

Mixed

References

Nations at the 2022 World Aquatics Championships
2022
World Aquatics Championships